Parker Bailey (1902 – 1980) was an American composer, pianist, and lawyer.  He was a nephew of Horatio Parker, with whom he had hoped to study at Yale University, but Parker died before taking him on.  Bailey served for a time as a lawyer at the Securities and Exchange Commission, but remained active as a composer for much of his life.

References

Papers at Yale University

External links 
 The Parker Bailey Collection, 1930–1980 at the Library of Congress

1902 births
1980 deaths
20th-century American composers
20th-century American pianists
American male composers
20th-century American lawyers
U.S. Securities and Exchange Commission personnel
American male pianists
20th-century American male musicians